A number of ships and submarines of the French Navy have borne the name Perle ("pearl").

Ships 
 Perle (1663), a 34-gun ship of the line, ex-Tric captured from the navy of Algiers
 Perle (1673), a galley 
 Perle (1675), a 5th-rank ship of the line, ex-Dauphin or Dauphin de Bayonne
 Perle (1682), a galley
 Perle (1690), a 54-gun ship of the line 
 Perle (1694), a Fleur de Lis-class galley 
 Perle (1725), a Perle-class galley
 Perle (1745), a 12-gun corvette
 Perle (1746), a 32-gun frigate
 Perle (1768), a Rossignol-class corvette 
 Perle (1790), a frigate later captured and commissioned in the Royal Navy as HMS Amethyst
 Perle (1813), a 44-gun frigate 
 Perle (1829), a 20-gun corvette
 Perle (1831), a 46-gun frigate, ex-Pérola captured from the Portuguese during the Battle of the Tagus
 Perle (1860), a Calédonienne-class schooner
 Perle (1875), a Calédonienne-class schooner
 , a  launched in 1903 and stricken in 1914
 , a  launched in 1935 and sunk in 1944
 , a  launched in 1990

See also 
 Perle de Londres (1696), a 6-gun fluyt

References
 
 
 

French Navy ship names